The Truth About Love is a 2005 film directed by John Hay and starring Jennifer Love Hewitt, Jimi Mistry and Dougray Scott.

Plot
After Alice Holbrook (Jennifer Love Hewitt), a happily married English woman living in Bristol, receives an anonymous Valentine's Day card with radish seeds in it, she automatically assumes the card is from her supposedly loving lawyer husband, Sam (Jimi Mistry), and that he is trying to be romantic. In return, Alice decides to write an anonymous reply to her husband to keep the gimmick going, but only accidentally sends the card after a drunken night with her sister. What Alice does not realise, however, is that her husband did not, in fact, send her the original Valentine's Day card; her husband's best friend and lawyer partner, Archie (Dougray Scott), did.

Main cast
 Jennifer Love Hewitt – Alice Holbrook
 Dougray Scott – Archie Gray
 Jimi Mistry – Sam Holbrook
 Branka Katić – Katya
 Kate Miles – Felicity
 Stefan Dennis – Dougie
 Simon Webbe – Dan Harlow

Reception
On Rotten Tomatoes, the film has a 0% rating based on 11 critic reviews.

References

External links
 
 

2005 films
2005 romantic comedy films
British romantic comedy films
American romantic comedy films
Films shot in Bristol
2000s English-language films
2000s American films
2000s British films